Plagiotremus townsendi, Townsend's fangblenny, is a species of combtooth blenny found in coral reefs in the western Indian ocean.  This species reaches a length of  TL.

Diet
This fish feeds on mucus secreted by other fish, according to, citing Springer and Smith-Vaniz (1972).

References

townsendi
Fish described in 1905
Mucous feeding fish